Ivanna Pessina (born 18 April 1990) is an Argentine-Italian field hockey player for the Italian national team.

She participated at the 2018 Women's Hockey World Cup.

References

1990 births
Living people
Argentine female field hockey players
Italian female field hockey players
Female field hockey defenders